Matt Marraccini (born May 12, 1981 in Poland, Ohio) is an American actor.

Marraccini made a guest spot on future General Hospital costar Kirsten Storms' now canceled CBS show Clubhouse. He has starred in two movies, Death Valley: The Revenge of Bloody Bill in 2004, and Believers Among Us in 2005.

He played undercover cop Jesse Beaudry on General Hospital beginning in June 2005 but was let go from the soap after only a year. Jesse was killed off in 2006.

Television filmography
General Hospital as Jesse Beaudry (29 June 2005 – 31 March 2006)

External links

Matt Marraccini profile
Matt Marraccini photo gallery
Matt Marraccini Online--Official Site

American male soap opera actors
Living people
People from Poland, Ohio
1981 births